Cerici is a village in the municipality of Banja Luka, Republika Srpska, Bosnia and Herzegovina.

Cerici used to be inhabited by Croats until the outbreak of the Bosnian War.

Demographics
Ethnic groups in the village include:
13 Serbs (81.25%)
3 Croats (18.75%)

References

Villages in Republika Srpska
Populated places in Banja Luka